Trevor Carrick (born July 4, 1994) is a Canadian professional ice hockey defenceman who is currently playing for the Syracuse Crunch of the American Hockey League (AHL) while under contract with the Tampa Bay Lightning of the National Hockey League (NHL). He was selected in the fourth round, 115th overall, by the Carolina Hurricanes in the 2012 NHL Entry Draft.

Playing career
Carrick played major junior hockey in the Ontario Hockey League with the Mississauga St. Michael's Majors/Mississauga Steelheads and the Sudbury Wolves. After completing his lone season with the Majors, Carrick was selected in the fourth round, 115th overall, by the Carolina Hurricanes during the 2012 NHL Entry Draft. On December 18, 2013, the Hurricanes signed Carrick to a three-year, entry-level contract.

Carrick had a breakout season with the Charlotte Checkers during the 2015–16 season. He recorded a career-high 42 points in 70 games and was named to the AHL All-Star Game. Carrick also received his first NHL recall by the Hurricanes on March 15, 2016. He made his NHL debut the following day against the Washington Capitals.

On May 29, 2018, the Hurricanes re-signed Carrick to a one-year contract extension.

On August 6, 2019, Carrick was traded to the San Jose Sharks in exchange for Kyle Wood. Immediately following the trade, Carrick signed a two-year contract extension with the Sharks.

Entering the pandemic-delayed 2020–21 season, Carrick was initially reassigned to the San Jose Barracuda. On January 27, 2021, Carrick was traded by the Sharks in a three-way trade to the Anaheim Ducks in exchange for Jack Kopacka. Carrick joined brother Sam, following his reassignment to AHL affiliate in the San Diego Gulls.

As a free agent from the Ducks, Carrick was signed to a one-year, two-way contract for the  season with the Tampa Bay Lightning on July 25, 2022.

Personal life
Carrick is the son to John F. and Jane Carrick. John played junior C hockey with the Stouffville 70s. He is the third of four brothers who are all ice hockey players: brothers Jake (born 1990), Sam (born 1992) and Josh Carrick (born 1995), have all played major junior ice hockey in the Ontario Hockey League. Sam is also currently playing within the Anaheim Ducks organization, who acquired him from the Chicago Blackhawks organization in March 2017. Carrick is also a cousin to Bobby Hughes, who most recently played for the Brampton Beast of the ECHL in 2014-15.

Career statistics

Awards and honours

References

External links

 

1994 births
Living people
Canadian expatriate ice hockey players in the United States
Canadian ice hockey defencemen
Carolina Hurricanes draft picks
Carolina Hurricanes players
Charlotte Checkers (2010–) players
Ice hockey people from Ontario
People from Whitchurch-Stouffville
San Diego Gulls (AHL) players
San Jose Barracuda players
San Jose Sharks players